Anglia Television Ltd v Reed [1972] 1 QB 60 is an English contract law case, concerning the right to reliance damages for loss flowing from a breach of contract.

Judgment 

Lord Denning MR held that expenditure incurred before could be claimed, so long as it was within the contemplation of the parties. Here Reed would have known of considerable expense.

So not £854.65 awarded (after) but the full £2750 (before as well) for all the directors, designers, stage managers, and assistant managers' fees.

Notes

References 

Lord Denning cases
1972 in British law
1972 in case law
Court of Appeal (England and Wales) cases
English remedy case law